Minerva Parker Nichols (May 14, 1863 – 1949) was an architect from the United States who in 1889 became the first woman to operate an independent architectural practice in the United States.  She designed at least eighty known buildings, which included homes, schools, churches, and clubhouses.

Early years and education
Minerva Parker was born May 14, 1863, in Chicago, Illinois. She was a descendant of John Doane who landed in Plymouth, in 1630, and took an active part in the government of the colony. Seth A. Doane, the grandfather of Nichols was an architect and went to Chicago when it was an outpost and trading settlement among the Native Americans. Her father, John W. Doane, died in Murfreesborough, Tennessee, during the Civil War, being a member of an Illinois Volunteer Regiment.

She studied at the Philadelphia Normal Art School, and studied modeling under John J. Boyle.

Career
Nichols entered an architect's office as draftsman. She joined the architectural firm of Frederick G. Thorn in Philadelphia. She took control of the firm after Thorn's death in 1888 and held the position for seven years. In 1896, she and her husband left the Philadelphia area and she began a private practice mostly for friends and relatives.

Nichols was the second (after Louise Blanchard Bethune) American female architect who established a very successful, although brief, business and recognition, and the first one who did so without partnership or assistance of a man.

Later, she built the Woman's New Century Club, in Philadelphia. Besides her practical work in designing houses, she delivered in the School of Design, in Philadelphia, a course of lectures on Historic Ornament and Classic Architecture. Among some of her important commissions was one for the designing of the International Club House, known as the Queen Isabella Pavilion, at the World's Columbian Exposition, Chicago, in 1893. She was among the first women to enter the field of architecture and some of the homes in the suburbs of Philadelphia attest to her ability and talent in this line. In December, 1899, she married Rev. William J. Nichols, a Unitarian clergyman.

Notable buildings
New Century Club (Philadelphia)
New Century Club (Wilmington, Delaware)
Buckingham Browne & Nichols school, Cambridge, Massachusetts (1894)

References

Bibliography

External links
"Minerva Parker Nichols: A First American Woman Architect, 1860-1943"
Minerva Parker Nichols at Philadelphia Architects and Buildings
Preserving Minerva, website by architectural historian Molly Lester

1863 births
1949 deaths
19th-century American architects
American women in business
20th-century American architects
American women architects
Architects from Illinois